"Can't Sleep Love" is a song recorded by American a cappella group Pentatonix from their eponymous fourth studio album, Pentatonix (2015). It was released as the lead single from the album via RCA Records on September 4, 2015, and is Pentatonix's first original track. It was written by all members of Pentatonix with Elof Loelv, Kevin Figueiredo, Teddy Peña and William Wells, and was produced by the band. A second version of the song, featuring American musician Tink, was released on September 18, 2015.

Chart performance
"Can't Sleep Love" first entered the US Billboard Hot 100 at number 99 on the week ending November 7, 2015.

Music video
The music video for "Can't Sleep Love" was released at September 4, 2015. The version featuring Tink was released at September 18, 2015.
The video shows the Members of Pentatonix in various rooms with elaborate wallpaper designs and models with their bodies painted to match the rooms.

Live performances
Pentatonix performed "Can't Sleep Love" on The Tonight Show Starring Jimmy Fallon on October 16, 2015.

Track listings
Digital download 
 "Can't Sleep Love" – 2:53
Digital download (featuring Tink) 
 "Can't Sleep Love" (featuring Tink) – 3:33

Charts and certifications

Weekly charts

Certifications

References

2015 songs
2015 singles
RCA Records singles
Songs written by Elof Loelv
Pentatonix songs